The 2010 Slovak Cup Final was the final match of the 2009–10 Slovak Cup, the 41st season of the top cup competition in Slovak football. The match was played at the Zemplin Stadium in Michalovce on 11 May 2010 between Spartak Trnava and Slovan Bratislava. Slovan Bratislava won after the match ended 6–0.

Road to the final

Match

Details

References

Slovak Cup Finals
Cup Final
Slovak Cup
Slovak Cup